Governor Riley may refer to:

Bob C. Riley (1924–1994), Acting Governor of Arkansas in 1975
Bob Riley (born 1944), 52nd Governor of Alabama
Richard Riley (born 1933), 111th Governor of South Carolina
Bennet C. Riley (1787–1853), 7th Military Governor of California

See also
Bernard Rawdon Reilly (1882–1966), first Governor of Aden